Lara FS Academy is a discipline alternative school for at-risk students in Laredo Independent School District, located in central Laredo, Texas.

References

External links
 

Laredo Independent School District
Schools in Laredo, Texas
Public high schools in Texas
Alternative schools in the United States